Ali Asghar Kutki (also Romanized as ʿAlī Āṣghar Kūtḵī) is a village in Abezhdan Rural District, Abezhdan District, Andika County, Khuzestan Province, Iran. At the 2006 census, its population was 109, in 22 families.

References 

Populated places in Andika County